Men's lightweight coxless four was an event in Rowing at the 2004 Summer Olympics in Athens, Greece. The team from Denmark won the event. Four men were in each boat. The Rowing events were held at the Schinias Olympic Rowing and Canoeing Centre.

Medalists

Heats – 15 August

SF denotes qualification to semifinal
R denotes qualification to repechage

Heat 1

Heat 2

Heat 3

Repechage – 17 August

: Sergej Burkeev, Valerij Saritchev, Aleksandr Savkin, Aleksandr Zyuzin, 5:52.87 -> Semifinal A/B
: Veljko Urošević, Nenad Babović, Goran Nedeljković, Miloš Tomić, 5:54.27 -> Semifinal A/B
: Mario Arranz Puente, Jesus Gonzalez Alvarez, Carlos Loriente Perez, Alberto Dominguez Lorenzo, 5:56.15 -> Semifinal A/B
: Mike Hennessy, Tim Male, Nick English, Mark Hunter, 5:58.80

Semifinals – 19 August

Semifinal A
: Lorenzo Bertini, Catello Amarante, Salvatore Amitrano, Bruno Mascarenhas, 5:55.02 -> Final A
: Glen Loftus, Anthony Edwards, Ben Cureton, Simon Burgess, 5:55.22 -> Final A
: Iain Brambell, Jonathan Mandick, Gavin Hassett, Jon Beare, 5:57.44 -> Final A
: Juliusz Madecki, Sebastian Sageder, Bernd Wakolbinger, Wolfgang Sigl, 5:58.73 -> Final B
: Veljko Urošević, Nenad Babović, Goran Nedeljković, Miloš Tomić, 6:00.07 -> Final B
: Pat Todd, Matt Smith, Paul Teti, Steve Warner, 6:01.84 -> Final B

Semifinal B
: Thor Kristensen, Thomas Ebert, Stephan Mølvig, Eskild Ebbesen, 5:55.85 -> Final A
: Gerard van der Linden, Ivo Snijders, Karel Dormans, Joeri de Groot, 5:57.47 -> Final A
: Richard Archibald, Eugene Coakley, Niall O'Toole, Paul Griffin, 5:58.89 -> Final A
: Sergej Burkeev, Valerij Saritchev, Aleksandr Savkin, Aleksandr Zyuzin, 5:59.75 -> Final B
: Martin Mueller-Fackle, Axel Schuster, Stefan Locher, Andreas Bech, 6:03.08 -> Final B
: Mario Arranz Puente, Jesus Gonzalez Alvarez, Carlos Loriente Perez, Alberto Dominguez Lorenzo, 6:07.01 -> Final B

Finals

Final A – 22 August
: Thor Kristensen, Thomas Ebert, Stephan Mølvig, Eskild Ebbesen, 5:56.85
: Glen Loftus, Anthony Edwards, Ben Cureton, Simon Burgess, 5:57.43 
: Lorenzo Bertini, Catello Amarante, Salvatore Amitrano, Bruno Mascarenhas, 5:58.87
: Gerard van der Linden, Ivo Snijders, Karel Dormans, Joeri de Groot, 5:58.94
: Iain Brambell, Jonathan Mandick, Gavin Hassett, Jon Beare, 6:07.04
: Richard Archibald, Eugene Coakley, Niall O'Toole, Paul Griffin, 6:09.33

Final B – 21 August
: Veljko Urošević, Nenad Babović, Goran Nedeljković, Miloš Tomić, 6:19.00
: Sergej Burkeev, Valerij Saritchev, Aleksandr Savkin, Aleksandr Zyuzin, 6:20.64
: Pat Todd, Matt Smith, Paul Teti, Steve Warner, 6:22.24
: Juliusz Madecki, Sebastian Sageder, Bernd Wakolbinger, Wolfgang Sigl, 6:22.85
: Martin Mueller-Fackle, Axel Schuster, Stefan Locher, Andreas Bech, 6:23.28
: Mario Arranz Puente, Jesus Gonzalez Alvarez, Carlos Loriente Perez, Alberto Dominguez Lorenzo, 6:26.15

References

External links
Official Olympic Report

Men's Lwt Coxless Four
Men's events at the 2004 Summer Olympics